Ji Li may refer to:

 Ji Li (ceremony), the Confucian coming of age ceremony for women
 King Ji of Zhou, also known as Ji Li
 Guan Li, the Confucian coming of age ceremony for men

See also
 Jili (disambiguation)
 Li Ji (disambiguation)